The list of shipwrecks in May 1824 includes some ships sunk, foundered, grounded, or otherwise lost during May 1824.

1 May

3 May

4 May

5 May

6 May

7 May

8 May

9 May

10 May

15 May

22 May

23 May

24 May

26 May

29 May

Unknown date

References

1824-05